St. Martin's Church or St. Martin of Tours Church may refer to any one of a number of churches. These are mostly dedicated to Martin of Tours. They include:

Belgium
, Aalst
, Arlon
; see Georges-Jacques Aelsters
Saint Martin's Church (Kortrijk)
Saint Martin's Church (Ypres), formerly a cathedral

Croatia
St Martin's Church (Split)

Denmark
 St. Martin's Church (Næstved)

Estonia
  (Saint Martin's Church of Käina), a church in Estonia
 Valjala church (Saint Martin's Church of Valjala)

France

Alsace
 Saint-Martin Church, Colmar
 
 Église Saint-Martin, Marmoutier

Auvergne
 St Martin's Church, Chavenon, in the Allier département
 Église Saint-Martin, in Montluçon in the Allier département

Bourgogne
 Église Saint-Martin, in Murlin

Bretagne
l’église Saint-Martin, Brest

Centre
 Église Saint-Martin d'Amilly, Amilly, Loiret
 Église Saint-Martin de Beaune-la-Rolande, Beaune-la-Rolande
 Église Saint-Martin (Mardié), Mardié
 Église Saint-Martin (Olivet), Olivet, Loiret

Midi-Pyrénées
 Église Saint-Martin d'Arèch, Castelnau-d'Auzan

La Réunion
 , Salazie

Germany
 St. Martin's Chapel, Furtwangen, Baden-Württemberg
 St. Martin, Sindelfingen, Baden-Württemberg
 St. Martin's Church, Landshut, Bavaria
 St. Martin, Moosach, Munich, Bavaria
 St. Martinus, Hattersheim, Hesse
 St. Martin, Idstein, Hesse
 St Martin's Church, Kassel, Hesse
 Great St. Martin Church, Cologne, North Rhine-Westphalia
 St. Martin's Church, Netphen, North Rhine-Westphalia
 Mainz Cathedral, Rhineland-Palatinate

Latvia
St. Martin's Church, Riga

Malta
St Martin's Chapel, Baħrija

The Netherlands
St. Martin's Cathedral, Utrecht in Utrecht
 Martinikerk (disambiguation)

Portugal 
Igreja de São Martinho (Argoncilhe), Santa Maria da Feira
Igreja de São Martinho (Padroso), Montalegre
Igreja de São Martinho, Funchal, Madeira
Igreja Matriz de São Martinho de Candoso, Guimarães
Igreja de São Martinho de Cedofeita, Porto
Igreja de São Martinho de Lordelo, Porto
Igreja de São Martinho de Mouros, Resende
Church of São Martinho (Alvaredo), Melgaço, Portugal

Slovakia
 St. Martin's Cathedral, Bratislava

Spain
 Church of St Martin, Callosa de Segura in Callosa de Segura, Alicante
 Church of San Martín (Entrena)
 St Martin's Church, Puig-reig, Barcelona, Catalonia
 Basilica of San Martin de Mondoñedo, Foz, Galicia
 Church of St Martin of Tours (San Martín del Rey Aurelio)

United Kingdom
 St Martin's Church, Allerton Mauleverer, North Yorkshire
 St Martin's Church, Ashton upon Mersey, Greater Manchester
 St Martin in the Bull Ring, Birmingham
 St Martin's Church, Bladon, Oxfordshire
 St Martin's Church, Brampton, Cumbria
 St Martin's Church, Brighton
 St Martin's Church, Canterbury
 St Martin's Church, Chipping Ongar, Essex
 St Martin's Chapel, Chisbury, Wiltshire
 St Martin's Church, Colchester, Essex
 St Martin's Church, Gospel Oak, London
 St Martin's Church, Great Mongeham, Great Mongeham, Kent
 Church of St Martin, Cwmyoy, Monmouthshire
 St Martin le Grand, York, North Yorkshire
 St Martin of Tours Church, Detling, Kent
 St Martin's Church, Dorking, Surrey
 St Martin's Church, East Horsley, East Horsley, Surrey
 St Michael and St Martin's Church, Eastleach Martin, Gloucestershire
 St Martin's Church, Eglwysbach, Conwy, Wales
 St Martin's Church, Knebworth 
 Cathedral Church of St Martin, Leicester
 St Martin, Ludgate, London
 St Martin-in-the-Fields, London
 St Martin Vintry, London (former church)
 St Martin Pomary, London (former church)
 St Martin's Church, Martinhoe, Cornwall
 St Martin's Church, Oxford
 St Martin's Church, Preston Gubbals, Shropshire
 St Martin's Church, Ruislip, Greater London
 St Martin of Tours' Church, Saundby, Nottinghamshire
 St Martin-on-the-Hill, Scarborough, North Yorkshire
 St Martin's Church, Stamford, Lincolnshire
 St Martin's Church, Waithe, Lincolnshire
 St Martin's Church, Wareham, Dorset
 St Martin of Tours' Church, West Coker, Somerset
 St Martin's Church, Whenby, North Yorkshire
 St Martin-cum-Gregory's Church, Micklegate, York, North Yorkshire

United States

 St. Martin of Tours Catholic Church, Los Angeles, California
 St. Martin of Tours Catholic Church (Louisville, Kentucky)
 St. Martin's Episcopal Church (Showell, Maryland)
 St. Martin of Tours Catholic Church (Gaithersburg, Maryland), a parish in the Roman Catholic Archdiocese of Washington
 St. Martin of Tours Catholic Church (St. Martinville, Louisiana), St. Martinville, Louisiana
 St. Martin's Church (Starkenburg), Starkenburg, Missouri

 St. Martin of Tours' Church (Bronx, New York)
 St. Martin's Catholic Church, Cincinnati, Ohio
 St. Martin's Catholic Church, Valley City, Ohio
 St. Martin of Tours Episcopal Church, Omaha, Nebraska
 St. Martin's Church (Marcus Hook, Pennsylvania)
 Saint Martin of Tours Parish Roman Catholic Church, Oxford Circle, Philadelphia, Pennsylvania
 Saint Martin's Church, Providence, Rhode Island
 St. Martin's Catholic Church and Grotto, Oelrichs, South Dakota

 St. Martin's Episcopal Church (Houston), Texas
 St. Martin's Catholic Church, Tours, Texas

See also
 St. Martin's (disambiguation)